Sharmila Malla (Shah) 
is a Nepali actress, model and producer. She made her acting debut in the Kanchhi movie  and other notable films include Ke Ghar Ke Dera, Basudev, Maya Pirati, Badal, Gothalo.

Filmography

Awards

References 

Living people
Nepalese female models
21st-century Nepalese actresses
Year of birth missing (living people)